Conus gilvus is a species of sea snail, a marine gastropod mollusk in the family Conidae, the cone snails, cone shells or cones.

These snails are predatory and venomous. They are capable of "stinging" humans.

The epithet "gilvus" is a Latin word meaning "pale yellow".

Description
The size of the shell varies between 24 mm and 38 mm.

Distribution
This marine species occurs off New Guinea, the Solomon Islands and off Indonesia.

References

 Tucker J.K. & Tenorio M.J. (2013) Illustrated catalog of the living cone shells. 517 pp. Wellington, Florida: MdM Publishing.
 Puillandre N., Duda T.F., Meyer C., Olivera B.M. & Bouchet P. (2015). One, four or 100 genera? A new classification of the cone snails. Journal of Molluscan Studies. 81: 1-23

External links
 World Register of Marine Species
 

gilvus
Gastropods described in 1849